Prats-du-Périgord is a commune in the Dordogne department in Nouvelle-Aquitaine in southwest France.

Population

Local culture and heritage

Places and monuments

Église Saint-Maurice de Prats-du-Périgord
The main part of the church was built in 12th and 13th centuries as part of a commandery of the Knights Hospitaller order. The entrance is a through a tall flat bell-tower with four bell openings into the church's nave. The chevet-aspe is extremely high and is fortified with murder holes or meurtrière. The church is the property of the municipality and was registered as a historical monument on 24 June 1948.

See also 
Communes of the Dordogne department

References 

Communes of Dordogne